Hazrat Sheikh Baba Shadi Shaheed (RehmatUllahaleh) also known as Raja Shadab Khan (former name  Maharaja DharamChand Chib) was a Sufi saint. He was the first Chib Rajput who married a Mughal Princess during the reign of Babur.  He was a famed wise man who was requested to treat the ailing emperor, Babur, in Delhi. As a reward, Babur gave his daughter in marriage to him. He also married Humayun's niece who is the daughter of Pir Haibat, of Kandahar, which ultimately leads to his death during Akbar's reign. Raja Shadab Khan, was a contemporary and feudatory of the Emperors Babur, Humayun and Akbar; and he ruled over the districts of Bhimber, Mirpur and Nowshera, within the present limits of Jammu and Kashmir. In consideration of his services rendered to the Emperor Akbar in Kandahar, he was made Governor of Kashmir with the title of Shadab Khan. He also served as governor of Kandahar during Akbar's reign. His tribe, the Chib Rajputs of Kashmir and Punjab, come to his shrine in Jandi Chontra in Bhimber to pay their respects and ritualistically celebrate the births of their children.  In the last few decades, the popularity of the shrine has grown among non-tribe members due to the belief that visiting the shrine will help childless couples to bear children.

Originally Rajput, the ruling family embraced Islam at a later date which is uncertain, but probably not later than the time of Babur, from whom the head of the family, named Shadi, is said to have received a confirmation for his possessions. He took the name of Shadab Khan, and is said to have accompanied Humayun on some of his expeditions, and was finally killed by one, Pir Haibat, of Kandahar, and has ever since been venerated as a saint. His tomb is near the town of Bhimber, and is a place of pilgrimage to which both Hindus and Muslims go to. The shrine is called Sur Sadi Shahid. At his shrine every Chib child must be presented on attaining a certain age, so that the lock of hair, specially retained for the purpose, may be cut off with much ceremony; without this he cannot become a true Chib.

References

Kashmiri Sufi saints
15th-century Indian scholars
People from Bhimber District
15th-century Indian Muslims